William McLean (1824–1907) was a merchant and politician in Quebec. He served as mayor of Aylmer from 1868 to 1872.

He came to Aylmer in 1851 with his brother John. The brothers purchased a property on the main street where they operated a tannery and a general store. In 1864, they became the owners of the Aylmer Union Steam Mill, which became under their ownership the most important in the region. They sold the operation in 1890. McLean served on Aylmer municipal council from 1858 to 1868. He became mayor following the death of Robert Conroy.

McLean married Margaret Thompson and together they had seven children.

He died at the age of 83.

His former residence has been designated as a historic site by Quebec.

References 

1824 births
1907 deaths
Mayors of places in Quebec